Berekfürdő is a village in Jász-Nagykun-Szolnok county, in the Northern Great Plain region of central Hungary.

Geography

Population
It has a population of 1010 people (2015).

References

External links 
 Official site in Hungarian, English and German
 Berekfürdő at funiq.hu 

Populated places in Jász-Nagykun-Szolnok County
Spa towns in Hungary